The Zanardelli government of Italy held office from 15 February 1901 until 3 November 1903, a total of 991 days, or 2 years, 8 months and 19 days.

Government parties
The government was composed by the following parties:

Composition

References

Italian governments
1901 establishments in Italy